Vadims Žuļevs (born 1 March 1988 in Brocēni) is a Latvian footballer, currently playing for FK Liepāja.

Club career 
As a youth player Žuļevs played in his home-town Brocēni, signing his first professional contract in 2006 with FK Daugava Daugavpils. Žuļevs played there for 2 years until 2008, making 24 league appearances and scoring no goals. In 2008, he left, signing with FK Daugava Riga. During 1 season there he played 13 matches, scoring 1 goal. In 2009, he went on trial with Nemzeti Bajnokság I club Lombard-Pápa TFC in Hungary and signed a contract with them, leaving Latvian Higher League. All over 3 seasons Žuļevs played 28 games for the Hungarian side. He left in 2012, joining FC Jūrmala in the Latvian Higher League. Žuļevs played 28 matches and scored 2 goals for Jūrmala in the 2012 season, finishing in the sixth place of the league table. In February 2013 he joined the Latvian Higher League club FK Jelgava. In May 2014 Žuļevs helped Jelgava win the Latvian Cup. In July 2014 Žuļevs returned to Hungary, signing a two-year contract with his previous club Lombard-Pápa TFC.

Žuļevs signed with FK Liepāja in the beginning of January 2019.

International career 
Žuļevs has made 22 appearances and scored one goal for Latvia U-21. He made his debut for Latvia national football team on 16 October 2018 in a 2018–19 UEFA Nations League D game against Georgia.

Honours 
 Latvian Cup winner (2): 2008, 2014

References

External links 
 
 
 Profile at HLSZ 

1988 births
Living people
People from Brocēni
Latvian footballers
Latvia youth international footballers
Latvia under-21 international footballers
Latvia international footballers
FC Daugava players
Daugava Rīga players
Lombard-Pápa TFC footballers
FC Jūrmala players
FK Jelgava players
FK Ventspils players
FK Liepāja players
Nemzeti Bajnokság I players
Latvian expatriate footballers
Expatriate footballers in Hungary
Latvian expatriate sportspeople in Hungary
Latvian people of Ukrainian descent
Association football midfielders